Marcel Stäuble (born 23 April 1961) is a Swiss former cyclist. He competed in the road race at the 1988 Summer Olympics.

References

1961 births
Living people
Swiss male cyclists
Olympic cyclists of Switzerland
Cyclists at the 1988 Summer Olympics
Place of birth missing (living people)